Mike Bossy the Scoring Machine is a pinball machine manufactured by Game Plan, Inc. as a prototype in 1982, featuring New York Islanders hockey star Mike Bossy. There was only one machine produced. It was designed by Ed Cebula.

Gameplay
A warm up period prior to the actual gameplay is a unique feature that allows the player to test the functionality and features of the pinball machine gameplay. Up to four players can play. The score is kept between players up to nine goals. A red light flashes and a siren sounds when a score or a goal is made. 

At the time of the goal, the player can then try to work the flippers to get the ball to go through the MIKE BOSSY lights or gates. When hit while lighted, these give the players extra bonus points. When a player makes eight goals, a special light goes on which means extra bonus points. Up to 180,000 bonus points can be made. The game is over when the picture of Mike Bossy on the back glass lights up.

Technical features
The machine has self-diagnostic features to test sequences and input-output and memories prior to play. These tests can also be made manually. There are actual recordings of crowd noise, and the United States and Canadian national anthems.

References

 Mike Bossy pinball never released
 Arcade Flyer of pinball machine at Arcade Flyers website
   Game Plan Pinball machines - Mike Bossy The Scoring Machine
  Arcade history entry

External links
 

Game Plan pinball machines
1982 pinball machines